List of mountains and freestanding mountains in Kerala state, India. Height of the mountains is given in feet.

There are five free standing mountains in Kerala. That is, the mountains far from the Western Ghats.
Although these 5 mountains are far from the Western Ghats, they are all a branch of the Western Ghats.

See also
 List of mountains in India
 List of rivers in Kerala
 List of highest point in Kerala by districts

 
Kerala
mountains